Pitangueiras may refer to the following places in Brazil:

Pitangueiras, Paraná
Pitangueiras, São Paulo
Pitangueiras, Rio de Janeiro
Pitangueiras River